Tregole is a national park in South West Queensland, Australia, 603 km west of Brisbane. Until the gazetting of the park in 1975, the area was a grazing property. The park is located where the brigalow and mulga biospheres meet and has a representative sample of semi-arid ecosystems.

The park contains almost pure stands of the vulnerable Ooline tree.  The Ooline stand in Tregole is unusual as the climate is hot and dry.

The park has no camping facilities. A day-use area is 10 kilometres south of Morven on the Morven-Bollon Road.  There is a short (2.1 km) walk in the day-use area.

See also

 Protected areas of Queensland

References

External links

National parks of Queensland
Protected areas established in 1995
South West Queensland
1995 establishments in Australia